Lviv Oil Research & Refinery is a defunct Ukrainian oil refining enterprise that operated in Lviv from 1896 to 2009.

During April 2019, a public discussion on taking into account public interests during the development of a detailed plan of the area bounded by Bohdan Khmelnytsky, Promyslova, Ravska, Diamanda and Naftova streets, based on the decision of the executive committee of Lviv City Council from 22.08.2018 No. 931.

See also

 List of oil refineries

References

Companies established in 1896
History of Lviv Oblast
Oil refineries in Ukraine
Companies based in Lviv